Ophiomyia maura is a species of leaf miner flies (insects in the family Agromyzidae). It is found in northeastern North America and appears to be found most often in August and September. O. maura feeds mainly on True Goldenrods, including Solidago flexicaulis and Solidago altissima.

References

Agromyzidae
Articles created by Qbugbot
Insects described in 1838
Diptera of North America